David Whippey (or Whippy) was an American sailor from Nantucket who became a "beachcomber", a white resident of the Fijian islands who served as liaison between the local and foreign communities, and eventually was the United States vice-consul.

Whippey left Nantucket on the whaling ship Hero in 1816, but jumped ship in Peru. In 1824 he arrived in the Fijian Islands on the brig , Peter Dillon, master, who then left Whippey behind to collect tortoise shell, but never returned. Whippey settled in Fiji, married a local woman, and had families/children with three other women in three regions of the Fijian Islands. He also mediated between the Fijians and white sailors.

Whippey served as the vice-consul of the United States to Fiji from 1846 to 1856.

'In 1819 David Whippey shipped in a Nantucket whaler. After many months at sea he tired of life aboard the Massachusetts ‘spouter’, and when his ship reached the Fiji Islands - the ‘Cannibal Islands’ of those days - he skipped and went native. He learnt the lingo, became a favourite of, and adviser to, the ‘Cannibal King’ Seru Epenisa Cakobau. He learned the native Fijian language and learnt about the herbal medicines. He was made a chief and presided at cannibal banquets and ‘long-pig’ ceremonies, but whether he partook of the meat has not been recorded. There are hundreds of his descendants [who] live in the Fijian group and all around the world to this day. He helped many shipwrecked whalemen - at this time the Fijians were partial to white seamen - and prevented them from being turned into ‘long-pig’. When the islands were ceded to Britain in 1874, Whippey acted as official interpreter at the ceremony.'

References

Beachcombers
American emigrants to Fiji
Ambassadors of the United States to Fiji
Colony of Fiji people
People from Nantucket, Massachusetts
1820s in Fiji
1830s in Fiji
1840s in Fiji
1850s in Fiji
Fiji–United States relations
Year of birth missing
Year of death missing